Cycling at the 2000 Summer Paralympics consisted of 27 events in two disciplines, road cycling and track cycling.

Medal table

Participating nations

Events

Road cycling

Track cycling

See also 
 Cycling at the 2000 Summer Olympics

References 

 

2000 Summer Paralympics events
2000
Paralympics
2000 in road cycling
2000 in track cycling